Sara Sgarzi (born 27 May 1986) is an Italian synchronised swimmer. She competed in the team event at the 2016 Summer Olympics. Sgarzi an athlete of the Gruppo Sportivo Fiamme Oro.

References

External links
 

1986 births
Living people
Italian synchronized swimmers
Olympic synchronized swimmers of Italy
Synchronized swimmers at the 2016 Summer Olympics
Place of birth missing (living people)
Artistic swimmers of Fiamme Oro